Maria Uhre Nielsen (born 5 October 1999) is a Danish footballer who plays for the Danish Elitedivisionen club HB Køge, as a defender.

Club career

HB Køge
In July 2020, at the age of 21, Uhre signed the first professional contract in HB Køge women's team history in the Elitedivisionen, the top division of women's soccer in Denmark. Uhre was appointed Køge captain in June 2020. Uhre scored in the opening match of the league on 9 August 2020, in a 7–2 defeat against AaB Fodbold.

The following year, in 2021, HB Køge won their first Danish Championship in their first season in the Elitedivisionen. They also made it for the semifinal in the Danish Women's Cup 2020, but got kicked out of the tournament due to an overall 4–5 victory to Brøndby IF. Uhre was one of the key players on the court to secure the title. She also made her first appearance in the 2021-22 UEFA Women's Champions League, in the 2–0 win against Sparta Prague, on 8 September 2021. She was substituted in the 93rd minute, as replacement for Kyra Carusa.

Honours 
Elitedivisionen
Winner: 2021
Danish Women's Cup
Semifinalist: 2021

References

External links
 Maria Uhre Nielsen at Soccerdonna
 
 

1999 births
Living people
Danish women's footballers
Denmark women's international footballers
Women's association football defenders
Sportswomen
People from Kolding
Sportspeople from the Region of Southern Denmark